Judge Mills may refer to:

Michael P. Mills (born 1956), judge of the United States District Court for the Northern District of Mississippi
Richard Henry Mills (born 1929), judge of the United States District Court for the Central District of Illinois

See also
Justice Mills (disambiguation)